Mindaugas Bružas (born 26 June 1976) is a Lithuanian butterfly swimmer. He competed in three events at the 1996 Summer Olympics.

References

External links
 

1976 births
Living people
Lithuanian male butterfly swimmers
Olympic swimmers of Lithuania
Swimmers at the 1996 Summer Olympics
Sportspeople from Klaipėda